Lautaro Gabriel Torres (born 28 September 1996) is an Argentine professional footballer who plays as a midfielder for Ferro Carril Oeste.

Career
Torres began his career with Ferro Carril Oeste. He featured in his first match on 12 June 2016 against Almagro in Primera B Nacional, which was one of two in 2016; the other coming in a fixture with Gimnasia y Esgrima a week later. An overall of fifty-eight appearances followed in the next two seasons, with Torres scoring three goals; two of which arriving in separate games with All Boys.

Career statistics
.

References

External links

1996 births
Living people
People from San Isidro Partido
Argentine footballers
Association football midfielders
Primera Nacional players
Argentine Primera División players
Ferro Carril Oeste footballers
Club Atlético Patronato footballers
Central Córdoba de Santiago del Estero footballers
Sportspeople from Buenos Aires Province